Indian jewelry may refer to:
Indian jewellery
Indian Jewelry, a noise rock band from Houston, Texas